Aengus Ó Snodaigh (born 31 July 1964) is an Irish Sinn Féin politician, author and historian who has been a Teachta Dála (TD) for the Dublin South-Central constituency since the 2002 general election.

Early and personal life
A Dubliner and Irish language speaker, he attended school at Scoil Lorcáin and Coláiste Eoin, before studying at University College Dublin (UCD). Ó Snodaigh joined Sinn Féin while at university, where he was active in student politics, in 1983. He completed a Bachelor of Arts in History and Geography, and a Higher Diploma in Education. Having secured his teaching qualifications, he went on to teach at secondary level and as a literacy teacher in Dublin's inner city.

He is also the editor of Fealsúnacht, Feall agus Fuil which is a collection of historical essays concentrating on the 1798 Rebellion and several pamphlets on aspects of Irish republican history. He is a member of the board of the Ireland Institute, aimed at promoting discussion on Irish republicanism, culture and heritage which restored the Pearse brothers' birthplace and original family home at 27 Pearse Street, Dublin, and joint editor of the Institute's journal, The Republic. Ó Snodaigh is the brother of the three Ó Snodaigh brothers in the band Kíla, and is the son of the writer and publisher Pádraig Ó Snodaigh and the sculptor Cliodhna Cussen from Newcastlewest, County Limerick. He is married to Aisling Ní Dhálaigh; they live in Bluebell with their three children. He also worked as a journalist, book reviewer and proofreader for An Phoblacht newspaper. In one incident a book-bomb was sent to the office by Ulster loyalist paramilitaries and he carried the device outside the building, where it exploded a short time later, injuring two soldiers.

Political career
He was first elected to Dáil Éireann at the 2002 general election, having earlier contested the Dublin South-East constituency at the 1987 general election, and a by-election in the Dublin South-Central constituency in 1999. Seven of Ó Snodaigh's election workers were jailed for IRA membership in 2004. This included two men arrested in connection with an espionage ring at Leinster House, who worked in Ó Snodaigh's office. Ó Snodaigh criticised the non-jury anti-terror court that they were tried in.

He is the party Spokesperson on Irish, the Gaeltacht, Arts and Culture. He was previously the Sinn Féin party whip in the Dáil, the Sinn Féin representative on the National Forum on Europe and the party's spokesperson on the Treaty of Nice. He was a member of the Dáil Committee on Procedures and Privileges and the Committee on European Affairs in the 29th Dáil. He was re-elected at the 2007 general election. He has been a member of the Sinn Féin national executive, the Ard Chomhairle, for many years, has been on the Dublin executive of the party since 1985, and was part of the party's negotiations team during the Northern Ireland peace process.

Support for Palestine and Nazi propaganda comments
Ó Snodaigh is a well-known supporter of the Palestinian cause, and has in the past been highly critical of the actions of Israel.

During the 2009 Gaza–Israel conflict, Ó Snodaigh claimed that Alan Shatter, a Fine Gael TD, and the Israeli ambassador to Ireland had exposed the Oireachtas committee on Foreign Affairs to "propaganda, twisted logic and half truths". He also said that Joseph Goebbels, the Nazi propaganda minister, would have been proud of it. The Israeli ambassador to Ireland, Zion Evrony, labelled Ó Snodaigh's comments as "outrageous" and asked for an apology, which Ó Snodaigh refused. Shatter, the only Jewish member of the Dáil, said he was appalled by Ó Snodaigh's mindset that he would liken a Jewish politician to a Nazi minister. Fine Gael leader Enda Kenny demanded a retraction and described Ó Snodaigh's attack on Shatter as "despicable and outrageous". European Affairs Minister Dick Roche, a Fianna Fáil TD, said Ó Snodaigh's statement was "sickening and calculated to offend" and "the fact that Ó Snodaigh made his remarks in the period immediately before the National Holocaust Memorial Day makes his actions doubly reprehensible."

On 30 May 2010, he was one of three Irish politicians who were prevented from leaving Cyprus by authorities to join an international flotilla carrying aid to the blockaded Gaza Strip. In March 2011, Ó Snodaigh set off on another flotilla to Gaza. One of his shipmates was former TD and then-member of Fianna Fáil Chris Andrews, who later joined Sinn Féin.

Expenses controversy
It was reported in February 2012 that Ó Snodaigh's office had used €50,000 worth of ink cartridges from the Oireachtas between 2007 and 2008.

Published works
 The Republic: Culture in the Republic (with Finbar Cullen) Ireland Institute, 2005 
 The Rotunda: Birthplace of the Irish Volunteers, Republican Publications, 2013

References

External links
Aengus Ó Snodaigh's page on the Sinn Féin website

1964 births
Living people
Alumni of University College Dublin
Irish schoolteachers
Members of the 29th Dáil
Members of the 30th Dáil
Members of the 31st Dáil
Members of the 32nd Dáil
Politicians from County Dublin
Sinn Féin TDs (post-1923)
People educated at Coláiste Eoin
Members of the 33rd Dáil
People from Sandymount